Fleming Head is a prominent rock headland on the coast of Victoria Land, marking the south side of the terminus of Larsen Glacier where it enters the Ross Sea. it was mapped by the United States Geological Survey from surveys and U.S. Navy air photos, 1957–62, and was named by the Advisory Committee on Antarctic Names for John P. Fleming, Senior Chief Construction Electrician, U.S. Navy, a member of the McMurdo Station winter party, 1962 and 1966.

References 

Headlands of Victoria Land
Scott Coast